¡Viva la Pepa! is a Venezuelan telenovela written by Valentina Párraga and broadcast by Radio Caracas Television between 2000 and 2001.

Catherine Correia, Lilibeth Morillo and Julie Restifo starred as the main characters, accompanied by Juan Pablo Raba, Juan Carlos Alarcón, Carlos Olivier and Flavio Caballero. Dad Dáger and Eduardo Serrano starred as antagonists.

Cast
Catherine Correia as Josefina Lunar Pepita
Lilibeth Morillo as María José Maneiro Mari Pepi
Julie Restifo as Josefa Lunar Pepa
Juan Pablo Raba as Luis Ángel Perdomo
Juan Carlos Alarcón as Luis Raúl Graziani
Carlos Olivier as Pedro Galán "Perucho"
Flavio Caballero as Gonzalo Iturriza
Eduardo Serrano as Ulises Graziani
Dora Mazzone as Yiya Bencecry
Henry Soto as Ismael Bencecry
Alfonso Medina as José de Jesús "J.J" Moncada
Desideria D'Caro as Fedora de Graziani
Mirela Mendoza as Susana Bencecry
Eduardo Gadea Pérez as Rafael Perdomo
Victoria Roberts as Rosario Morales
Gonzalo Cubero as Jean François
Virginia Vera as Cándida
Anabell Rivero as Celina Requena
Beatriz Fuentes as Violeta Ruíz
Ramón Castro as Alberto Amengual "Bobby"
Émerson Rondón as Rodríguez
Freddy Galavis as Lorenzo
Carlos Cruz as King "Guaguancó"
Dad Dáger as Yakionassi Guaramato
Bebsabe Duque as Yesenia Maneiro
Bárbara Garófalo as Reinita
Juliet Lima as Angélica
Lila Morillo Mari Chucha Maneiro
Humberto García as El Sr. Girón
Kristin Pardo as Coralia
Rosa Palma as Inés Briceño
Gabriel Parisi as Inspector Medina
Araceli Prieto as Mercedes
Marisa Román as Mariana López
Elena Toledo as Lissette Pinto
Verushka Scalia as Doctora León
Iván Romero as Matías
Rhandy Piñango as Lindombi Guaramato

References

External links

Opening credits

Venezuelan telenovelas
2000 telenovelas
RCTV telenovelas
2000 Venezuelan television series debuts
2001 Venezuelan television series endings
Spanish-language telenovelas
Television shows set in Caracas